Apex Digital, Inc. is an American electronics manufacturer based in Walnut, California founded in 1997. It manufactures and distributes high definition and LCD panel televisions, DVD recorders and players, and other digital items including photo frames and bookshelf audio systems. It also has an office in Ontario, California.

History 
Apex Digital, Inc. was founded in 1997 by Wasim (CEO) and Ancle Hsu (Chief Operating Officer). In 2000, it introduced its first DVD players – the AD-600A – to the US market, which became successful due to their ability to play MP3 files; used to download music files off the internet during the height of the Napster controversy. By the end of 2001, Apex was the second leading marketer of DVD players in the US after Sony.

In 2001, Apex became the first company certified to produce DVD players compatible with Eastman Kodak’s picture CDs and its ViDVD player enabled users to connect to the internet.

Apex introduced new products in 2002, including a DVD player with a built-in hard drive for downloading TV programs and a range of television sets. In 2003, the company held 17% of the US DVD player market and began selling 42-inch HD plasma screen TVs and LCD monitors. Stephen Brothers, who originally led sales and marketing efforts, was named president in September of that year.

In January 2004 Apex introduced the "ApeXtreme" console for playing PC video games on a television screen. The system was cancelled in December that year; during this period, Ji was arrested in China on fraud charges against a supplier.

In 2019, Apex Digital entered a partnership with Bluestar Alliance, a private equity firm, to purchase Brookstone's online and wholesale businesses. Brookstone is a retail chain that filed for Chapter 11 bankruptcy in 2018.

Controversies 
A programming loophole in Apex’s first DVD player model meant that users could circumvent regional lockout and Macrovision’s copyright protection, meaning they could play DVDs from any region globally and record them onto videocassettes. Apex quickly discontinued the model and this problem was resolved in subsequent manufacturing.

Apex agreed to pay Philips, Sony and Pioneer a $7 patent royalty fee for every DVD player it produced, following a copyright infringement suit in 2002.

Acquisitions and partnerships 
From 2002 Apex developed its range of televisions in partnership with Sichuan Changhong Electric Co. Ltd, China’s largest manufacturer of colour televisions.

References 

Electronics companies of the United States
Companies based in the City of Industry, California
Companies established in 1997
Manufacturing companies established in 1997